De-sparsified lasso contributes to construct confidence intervals and statistical tests for single or low-dimensional components of a large parameter vector in high-dimensional model.

High-dimensional linear model

The usual method to find the parameter is by Lasso:

The de-sparsified lasso is a method modified from the Lasso estimator which fulfills the Karush–Kuhn–Tucker conditions is as follows:

where  is an arbitrary matrix. The matrix  is generated using a surrogate inverse covariance matrix.

Generalized linear model

Desparsifying -norm penalized estimators and corresponding theory can also be applied to models with convex loss functions such as generalized linear models.

Consider the following vectors of covariables  and univariate responses  for 

we have a loss function 

which is assumed to be strictly convex function in 

The -norm regularized estimator is 

Similarly, the Lasso for node wise regression with matrix input is defined as follows:
Denote by  a matrix which we want to approximately invert using nodewise lasso.

The de-sparsified -norm regularized estimator is as follows:

References

Generalized linear models